Guanine nucleotide-binding protein G(i), alpha-2 subunit is a protein that in humans is encoded by the GNAI2 gene.

Interactions 

GNAI2 has been shown to interact with:

 EYA2, 
 GPSM2, 
 Interleukin 8 receptor, alpha, 
 MDFI,
 RGS5,  and
 RIC8A.

References

Further reading